The Colombo-Ricci was an automatic revolver of Italian origin, designed around 1910. The weapon was chambered in the 10.35mm Ordinanza Italiana round.

Overview
The Colombo-Ricci is a blowback operated revolver that fires in semi auto, fed from a 6-round cylinder that rotates to the next round when fired ejecting the spent brass much like an automatic firearm.

See also
 Webley Fosbery

References

Revolvers of Italy